The Labrador ice sheet was a major ice sheet that periodically covered large parts of North America during glacial periods over the last ~2.6 million years. The seam between the two ice sheets passed over the northern tip of the Ugava Peninsula passing south across Hudson Bay and on to the Ontario shore near Fort Stevens. This seam continued southward across Lake Superior, east of the Keweenaw Peninsula of Michigan.  Southward into Wisconsin, along the Lake Michigan shoreline, crossing into western Illinois.  Reaching down the Mississippi River valley to its junction with the Missouri River, it reaches its most southern point.   At this point, the ice sheet no longer abuts the Keewatin ice sheet.

Centers
The Labrador Ice Sheet radiated from two focus points.  The primary Quebec Dome, centered over of Ungava Peninsula.  A second some, called the Hudson Bay Dome was to the west on shore of Hudson Bay, near Churchill, Manitoba.

See also
Laurentide Ice Sheet
Cordilleran ice sheet
Keewatin ice sheet
Labrador ice sheet
Baffin ice sheet

References

Bibliography
Fulton, R. J. & Prest, V. K. (1987). Introduction: The Laurentide Ice Sheet and its Significance. Géographie physique et Quaternaire, 41 (2), 181–186.

Glaciology
Glaciology of Canada
Glaciology of the United States
Ice ages
Ice sheets
Geology of Nunavut
Geology of Newfoundland and Labrador